Engelbert Krauskopf (August 21, 1820 – July 11, 1881) was a German-American settler, gunsmith, and naturalist. Born in  Bendorf, Germany, he emigrated to the United States in 1846, and became a settler of  Fredericksburg, Texas. He was trained as a cabinetmaker and gunsmith, and during the American Civil War once made a gun barrel especially for Robert E. Lee. He was also an inventor: when ammunition became scarce during the Civil War he and silversmith Adolph Lungkwitz developed a process for the manufacture of gun-caps. In 1872, he patented an improvement to a throttle valve stand with John M. Compant, and one of his last inventions was a microscope in the form of a magic lantern. An amateur botanist, he described the species Hesperaloe engelmannii (commonly known as Engelmann's red yucca).

References

1820 births
1881 deaths
People from Fredericksburg, Texas
German emigrants to the United States
19th-century naturalists
People from Bendorf
19th-century American botanists
Gunsmiths